Viktor Mitrou (Βίκτωρ Μήτρου; born June 24, 1973) is a retired male Greek weightlifter. He initially represented Albania, but became internationally distinguished with the Greece national team. Mitrou won a Silver Medal for Greece in the 2000 Summer Olympics.

Results
Born Viktor Mitro, in Vlorë, Albania, he initially represented Albania internationally until 1993, and then Greece for three consecutive Olympiads (1996, 2000, and 2004). Notably he became an Olympic medalist for Greece during the 2000 Summer Olympics, when he claimed the silver medal in the men's – 77 kg class. In that competition Mitrou lost first place to Chinese Zhan Xugang, only because of his own heavier body weight.

References

External links
sports-reference

1973 births
Living people
Sportspeople from Vlorë
Albanian male weightlifters
Greek male weightlifters
Weightlifters at the 1996 Summer Olympics
Weightlifters at the 2000 Summer Olympics
Weightlifters at the 2004 Summer Olympics
Olympic silver medalists for Greece
Olympic weightlifters of Greece
Olympic medalists in weightlifting
Naturalized citizens of Greece
Medalists at the 2000 Summer Olympics
World Weightlifting Championships medalists